Guntata Hriday He is an Indian Marathi-language television series which aired on Zee Marathi. It starred Mrinal Kulkarni in lead role.

Cast 
 Mrinal Kulkarni as Nayana Banarase
 Ritika Shrotri as Devi Banarase
 Sandeep Kulkarni as Vikram Banarase
 Vivek Lagoo as Vishwas Banarase
 Sagar Talashikar as Mayank
 Pallavi Subhash as Ananya
 Mohan Agashe
 Madhavi Soman
 Sneha Majgaonkar
 Shivraj Walvekar
 Angad Mhaskar
 Ajay Purkar
 Asha Shelar

Awards

References

External links 
 
 
 Guntata Hriday He at ZEE5

Marathi-language television shows
Zee Marathi original programming
2011 Indian television series debuts
2012 Indian television series endings